Murtak-e Pain (also Romanized as Mūrtak-e Pā’īn; also known as Mūrtak and Mūrtak-e Bālā) is a village in Eskelabad Rural District, Nukabad District, Khash County, Sistan and Baluchestan Province, Iran. At the 2006 census, its population was 269, in 81 families.

References 

Populated places in Khash County